Andrew Macpherson may refer to:

Andy Macpherson, Scottish rugby union referee
Andrew Macpherson (racing driver) in 2011 Australian GT Championship season
Andy Macpherson (studio owner), owner of Revolution Recording Studios, where First Offense was recorded

See also
Andrew McPherson (disambiguation)